"Tear Up This Town" is a 2016 song by English alternative rock band Keane. The song was released as a one-off single to feature on the soundtrack of the 2016 fantasy film A Monster Calls, directed by J. A. Bayona (Keane worked with Bayona on the video for their 2012 single "Disconnected"). The song was made available for digital download on 23 September 2016.

Track listing

Charts

References

2016 singles
2016 songs
Island Records singles
Keane (band) songs
Songs written by Jesse Quin
Songs written by Richard Hughes (musician)
Songs written by Tim Rice-Oxley
Songs written by Tom Chaplin